The Independent  was a weekly magazine published in New York City between 1848 and 1928. It was founded in order to promote Congregationalism and was also an important voice in support of abolitionism and women's suffrage. In 1924 it moved to Boston, Massachusetts.

Publication history

Beginnings
From its founding in 1848 until 1861 The Independent was edited by a team of three prominent Congregational ministers: Joseph Parrish Thompson, Richard Salter Storrs, and Leonard Bacon.  
It was published and financed by a group of New York businessmen led by Henry C. Bowen of the silk wholesaling firm Bowen & McNamee.  The editorial policy was strongly antislavery, which hurt the magazine's circulation initially, but it improved through the 1850s to reach 35,000 by the beginning of the American Civil War.

In 1861 Harriet Beecher Stowe's brother Henry Ward Beecher, who had been a regular contributor to the magazine, became its editor. His assistant editor was Theodore Tilton, who succeeded Beecher as editor in 1863 and remained in the position until 1870. During Tilton's tenure, The Independent took up the cause of women's suffrage. It also published poetry and literary contributions by authors including Elizabeth Barrett Browning, Harriet Beecher Stowe, Emma Lazarus, John Greenleaf Whittier and James Russell Lowell. It reached its highest circulation of 75,000 in 1870, the year in which Tilton retired as editor.

Trends

Tilton was succeeded by Henry C. Bowen, who continued as both editor and publisher until his death in 1896, when William Hayes Ward became editor. Thereafter the magazine devoted less attention to religious affairs, and contained more political coverage and illustrations. This trend continued under the editorship of Hamilton Holt (Bowen's grandson), a strong proponent of the League to Enforce Peace and later the League of Nations. During the second decade of the twentieth century The Independent absorbed three other magazines: The Chautauquan (1914), Harper's Weekly (1916), and Countryside (1917).

A printers' strike in 1919 was damaging to the magazine, which struggled with rising costs and changed hands several times during the 1920s. In 1924 its last owners moved it to Boston but it remained unsuccessful.  In 1928 The Independent was merged with The Outlook to form The Outlook and Independent.

Footnotes

External links
 The Independent at the HathiTrust: Record 1, Record 2. Coverage begins with vol. 30, 1878.

1848 establishments in New York (state)
1928 establishments in Massachusetts
Abolitionism in the United States
Defunct political magazines published in the United States
Magazines established in 1848
Magazines disestablished in 1928
Magazines published in Boston
Magazines published in New York City
Weekly magazines published in the United States